Echeveria is a large genus of flowering plants in the family Crassulaceae, native to semi-desert areas of Central America, Mexico and northwestern South America.

Description
Plants may be evergreen or deciduous. Flowers on short stalks (cymes) arise from compact rosettes of succulent fleshy, often brightly coloured leaves. Species are polycarpic, meaning that they may flower and set seed many times over the course of their lifetimes. Often numerous offsets are produced, and are commonly known as "hen and chicks", which can also refer to other genera, such as Sempervivum, that are significantly different from Echeveria. Many species of Echeveria serve important environmental roles, such as those of host plants for butterflies. For example, the butterfly Callophrys xami uses several species of Echeveria, such as Echevelia gibbiflora, for suitable host plants. Even more, these plants are integral to the oviposition process of C. xami and some other butterfly species as well.

Etymology
Echeveria is named for Atanasio Echeverría y Godoy, a botanical illustrator who contributed to Flora Mexicana.

Taxonomy
The genus was erected by A. P. de Candolle in 1828, and is named after the 18th century Mexican botanical artist Atanasio Echeverría y Godoy. , the genus consists of about 150 species, including genera such as Oliveranthus and Urbinia that have formerly been split off from Echeveria. Molecular phylogenetic studies have repeatedly shown the genus not to be monophyletic: species of Echeveria cluster with species of Cremnophila, Graptopetalum, Pachyphytum, and Thompsonella as well as species of Sedum sect. Pachysedum. The former Urbinia species do appear to form a monophyletic group within this grouping. Although it is clear that Echeveria is not monophyletic, its limits are not clear, and further analyses are needed to determine whether and how the genus should be split, or if it should be included in an expanded concept of Sedum.

Species
One source accepts the following species:

Cultivation

Many Echeveria species are popular as ornamental garden plants. They are drought-resistant, although they do better with regular deep watering and fertilizing. Most will tolerate shade and some frost, although hybrids tend to be less tolerant. Most lose their lower leaves in winter; as a result, after a few years, the plants lose their compact appearance and need to be re-rooted or propagated. In addition, if not removed, the shed leaves may decay, harboring fungus that can then infect the plant.

Propagation
They can be propagated easily by separating offsets, but also by leaf cuttings, and by seed if they are not hybrids.

Cultivars and Hybrids
Echeveria has been extensively bred and hybridized. The following is a selection of available plants.

‘Arlie Wright’
‘Black Prince’
‘Blue Heron’
‘Blue Surprise’ (E. × gilva)
'Crimson Tide'
‘Dondo’
‘Doris Taylor’
‘Ebony’ (E. agavoides cultivar)
‘Frank Reinelt’
‘Hoveyi’
‘Lipstick’ (E. agavoides cultivar)
‘Oliver’ (E. pulvinata cultivar)
‘Opalina’
‘Painted Lady’
‘Perle von Nürnberg’
‘Paul Bunyan’
‘Red’ (E. × gilva)
‘Ruberia’
‘Set-Oliver’
‘Tippy’
‘Victor Reiter’ (E. agavoides cultivar)
‘Wavy Curls’
‘Worfield Wonder’ (E. × derosa)

Award winning

The following have gained the Royal Horticultural Society’s Award of Garden Merit: 

Echeveria agavoides 
Echeveria chihuahuaensis
Echeveria derenbergii 
Echeveria elegans 
Echeveria ‘Perle von Nürnberg’ 
Echeveria runyonii ‘Topsy Turvy’ 
Echeveria secunda var. glauca ‘Compton Carousel’
Echeveria setosa
Echeveria × bombycina

Formerly in Echeveria
Dudleya – Alwin Berger placed this as a subtaxon of Echeveria, and species within were described as Echeveria.
Graptopetalum paraguayense (N.E.Br.) E.Walther (as E. weinbergii hort. ex T.B.Sheph.)
Pachyveria clavifolia (as E. clavifolia)
Reidmorania occidentalis (as E. kimnachii)

Photo gallery

References

External links

Flora Mexicana via Biodiversity Library

 
Crassulaceae genera
Succulent plants
Taxa named by Augustin Pyramus de Candolle